Jeff Guess (born 16 February 1948) is an Australian poet. He has published fifteen poetry collections, written two textbooks on teaching poetry and edited numerous poetry anthologies. He has won many first prizes for his poetry and been awarded five writing grants, and is often on judging panels for major poetry competitions, including the John Bray Award.

Biography
Jeff Guess was born in Adelaide, South Australia and has taught English in country and metropolitan secondary schools, 'Writing Poetry' at the Adelaide Institute of TAFE, and tutored at the University of South Australia. 

His first book Leaving Maps, published in 1984, was hailed by Judith Rodriguez in The Sydney Morning Herald as 'a major collection'. Samela Harris (The Advertiser Newspaper) has written of his collection Winter Grace 'Methinks he is the finest living Australian poet.' His poetry has been published widely and has appeared in most Australian newspapers and magazines. He is represented regularly in leading literary magazines including Australia Poetry, Island, Overland, Quadrant, Meanjin, Studio and Westerly.

He has co-written a textbook on teaching poetry in primary schools: Hands on Poetry (Twilight Publishing 1991; republished Dominie 1993). He has written a textbook for tertiary students entitled Writing Poetry, published by the Adelaide Institute of TAFE. There are entries for him in the International Authors and Writers Who’s Who, the Who’s Who of Australian Writers and the Oxford Companion to Australian Literature; and an article by Geoff Page in A Reader’s Guide to Contemporary Australian Poetry (UQP 1995). The National Defence Force Academy Library in Canberra holds his papers, manuscripts and letters, as part of the ‘Australian Special Research Collection’ and also the Archives of the State Library of South Australia ‘Collection Development’.

Collections 
 Leaving Maps (Friendly Street Poets 1984)
 Four in the Afternoon (Studio 1987)
 Painting the Town: The Gawler Poems (Wakefield Press 1988)
 Replacing Fuses in the House of Cards (Poetry Australia 1988)
 Rites of Arrival: Poems from Museums of the History Trust of SA (Wakefield Press 1990).
 Selected Sonnets (Collins/A&R 1991)
 Living in the Shade of Nothing Solid (Five Islands Press 1998)
 Winter Grace (Five Islands Press 2004)
 The Silent Classroom (Pembroke 2008)
 Autumn in Cantabile: The Gawler Poems (Trinity College 2011)
 Supposing Him to be the Gardener: The Mary Magdalen Suite (Sherwin & Stone 2017)
 Scanning the Soul (Sherwin & Stone 2019)
 The River of Footsteps (Sherwin & Stone 2019)
 Meditations (Sherwin & Stone 2020)
 The Translation of Rain: Selected Poems (Sherwin & Stone 2020)

Anthologies 
 The No. 12 Friendly Street Reader (Friendly Street Poets 1987). 
 The Inner Courtyard: A South Australian Anthology of Love Poetry (Wakefield Press 1990). 
 The House Next Door (Salisbury Council 1992). 
 The No. 18 Friendly Street Reader (Friendly Street Poets 1994). 
 Poetry After Lunch: The University Readings (Adelaide University 1996). 
 A Fall of Rainbows (Williamstown Women Writers 1997).
 No Strings Attached (Eremos 1999). 
 New Poets Seven (Friendly Street Poets/Wakefield Press 2002). 
 Encounters (Ariel 2002). 
 Two Schools of Thought (Pembroke School 2008)
 My Teacher Is a Ballerina (Trinity College 2011)

Reviews  
Jeff Guess is the greatest living South Australian poet. Bravo! 
Peter Goers (Sunday Mail)

What I value in his work is the quiet human voice of a person who thinks his own thoughts. The poem rises in an integrated way from experiences maturely reflected on.
Barrett Reid

I admire his work. I find it tender and perceptive, unafraid to show feeling. It's also inventive, with an eye for the angles of experience in which poetry can catch and accumulate.
Les Murray

Jeff Guess is a good poet, among the best we have currently.  
Max Harris

In my opinion, Jeff Guess is one of the most important poets writing in South Australia. His poems are thoughtful, and acutely observant and demonstrate an ability to handle language and control technique.
Robert Clark
 
I class Guess' work up there with KS Mackenzie and Ray Mathew; better than Stewart; and fully deserving of the national acclaim given Robert Gray.
Tom Thompson
 
Jeff Guess is one of the most interesting and versatile poets in South Australia, able to tackle a wide range of subjects and willing to experiment with new forms. His work is deeply reflective with a strong spiritual element and is the expression of a world view which is generous and compassionate. His work has intensity, impetus, and grace.
Jan Owen
 
His poetry shines with the light of passion and experience. Written with warmth, intelligence and exceptional insight, he captures time, place and humanity, from the universal to the delightfully local. 
Jude Aquilina  
 
One of the most accomplished poets presently writing in South Australia.  
Andrew Taylor  
 
A significant Australian poet.  
Paul Grover (Studio)

Jeff Guess’ name sings contemplative whimsy – but his poetry cuts to the chase. Succinct and sweet, it taps the timeless nerve of human universality while telling our culture’s tales with infinite grace. Methinks he is the finest living Australian poet. 
Samela Harris (The Advertiser)  
 
Jeff Guess’ quintessential well-made poem evokes the transience of human life while longing for some kind of permanence. He finds much of the transience and some of the permanence in country towns, which he recreates in achingly beautiful visual imagery. 
Graham Rowlands

Guess’s poems are reflective and subtle, often drawing the reader into an imaginative journey to make connections between a documented past or place or work and some moment of present epiphany.
David Gilbey
 
The winning poem ‘War Cemetery’ is outstanding with beautiful shifts in rhythm and sometimes a brilliant use of line and stanza breaks; lines of a sensitivity and intelligence that permeate the whole poem. They are lines worthy of Tennyson or Larkin, and that unforced poeticness is everywhere apparent. 
Dennis Haskell (Westerly Centre, University of Western Australia)

References

External links 

Australian poets
1948 births
Living people
Australian male poets